Annick is one of the nine electoral wards of East Ayrshire Council. Created in 2007, the ward elects four councillors using the single transferable vote electoral system. Originally a three-member ward, Annick was increased in size following a boundary review and has elected four councillors since the 2017 East Ayrshire Council election.

Since the creation of the ward, Labour, the Scottish National Party (SNP) and the Conservatives have held seats with each topping the poll in at least one election.

Boundaries
The ward was created following the Fourth Statutory Reviews of Electoral Arrangements ahead of the 2007 Scottish local elections. As a result of the Local Governance (Scotland) Act 2004, local elections in Scotland would use the single transferable vote electoral system from 2007 onwards so Annick was formed from an amalgamation of several previous first-past-the-post wards. It contained most of the former Stewarton East and Dunlop and Kilmaurs and Stewarton South wards as well as all of the former Stewarton Central ward and initially elected three members. Annick includes the northernmost part of the council area between its borders with North Ayrshire and East Renfrewshire and takes in the towns of Stewarton, Kilmaurs and Dunlop. Following the Fifth Statutory Reviews of Electoral Arrangements ahead of the 2017 Scottish local elections, the ward was expanded to elect four members. The towns of Fenwick, Moscow and Waterside – previously part of the Irvine Valley ward – to the east of the A77 were included in the new boundaries.

Councillors

Election results

2022 election

2017 election

2012 election

2007 election

Notes

References

Wards of East Ayrshire
Stewarton